Jeffrey Graham DaVanon (born December 8, 1973) is an American former professional baseball outfielder. He played in Major League Baseball (MLB) for the Anaheim Angels / Los Angeles Angels of Anaheim, Arizona Diamondbacks, and Oakland Athletics.

Professional career

Prior to the  season, he signed a contract with the Arizona Diamondbacks and appeared in 87 games for them. He batted .290 with 5 home runs and 35 RBI. His last game was on August 5 against the Houston Astros in which he injured a ligament in his ankle sliding into second base.

On August 4, the Diamondbacks released him. He was signed by the Oakland Athletics on August 10, 2007, and sent to Triple-A Sacramento. He had his contract purchased by the Athletics on August 17, 2007, when Mark Kotsay went on the disabled list. During his stint with the A's, he appeared in 26 games, batting .238, though not hitting any home runs and only getting 5 RBI.

He declared free agency on October 29, 2007. On December 21, 2007, the San Diego Padres signed him to a minor league contract with an invitation to spring training, but he didn't make the team and was released on March 22, . He later signed a minor league contract with the Chicago White Sox, playing for their Triple-A affiliate, the Charlotte Knights. He became a free agent at the end of the season.

He hit for the cycle on August 25, becoming the fourth player in Angels' team history to accomplish this feat.

Personal life
He is the son of Jerry DaVanon, a former major league infielder.

See also
 List of second-generation Major League Baseball players
 List of Major League Baseball players to hit for the cycle

External links

1973 births
Living people
Águilas Cibaeñas players
American expatriate baseball players in the Dominican Republic
American expatriate baseball players in Canada
Anaheim Angels players
Arizona Diamondbacks players
Bellaire High School (Bellaire, Texas) alumni
Baseball players from San Diego
Charlotte Knights players
Edmonton Trappers players
Los Angeles Angels players
Major League Baseball outfielders
Oakland Athletics players
Sacramento River Cats players
San Diego State Aztecs baseball players
Tucson Sidewinders players
Visalia Oaks players
Alaska Goldpanners of Fairbanks players